Cotovca may refer to several places in Moldova:

Cotovca, a village in Dobrogea Veche Commune, Sîngerei district
Cotovca, a village in Carmanova Commune, Transnistria